Kara or KARA may refer to:

Geography

Localities
 Kara, Chad, a sub-prefecture
 Kára, Hungary, a village
 Kara, Uttar Pradesh, India, a township
 Kara, Iran, a village in Lorestan Province
 Kara, Republic of Dagestan, a rural locality in Dagestan, Russia
 Kara, Sardauna, a village in Sardauna, Nigeria 
 Kara, Bougainville, a town on Bougainville Island in Papua New Guinea
 Kara, Togo, a city in northern Togo
 Kara Region
 Roman Catholic Diocese of Kara, Togo
 Gaya confederacy or Kara, a former confederation in the southern Korean peninsula
 Kara crater, a meteorite crater in northern Russia

Rivers, Seas
 Kara (river), a river in northern Russia, flowing into the Kara Sea
 Kara River (disambiguation), other rivers named Kara
 Kara Lake, Bolivia
 Kara Sea, a sea in the Arctic Ocean
 Kara Strait, a strait in Russia

People
 Kara (name), a surname and given name, and a list of people with the name
 Kara people, an ethnic group in Sudan  they exceed 100,000 members
 Kara people (Tanzania), an ethnic group, estimated 86,000 members
 Kara language (disambiguation)

Film and television
 Kara Film Festival, a film festival held at Karachi, Pakistan
 "Kara" (Smallville episode)
 "Kara" (Supergirl episode)
 Kara, a 2012 short CGI film, which anticipates Detroit: Become Human

Music
 Kara (South Korean group), a girl group
 Kara (British band), a folk music group

Other uses
 Kara (gastropod), a genus of land snails 
 Kara (Sikhism), a type of a steel bracelet
 KARA (FM), a radio station licensed to Williams, California, United States
 KARA (New Mexico), a defunct radio station formerly licensed to Albuquerque, New Mexico, United States
 Kara class cruiser, a Soviet warship class
 Acadiana Regional Airport's ICAO code
 Korea Automobile Racing Association

See also
 Kara Kara (disambiguation)
 
 Cara (disambiguation)
 Khara (disambiguation)
 Kiara (disambiguation)

Language and nationality disambiguation pages